Poppy Mountain, sometimes identified as Pease Ridge, its northwest descending crest, is a prominent peak in the Taconic Mountains of western Massachusetts. The mountain is located in Pittsfield State Forest and is traversed by the  Taconic Crest hiking trail. The overgrown summit is wooded with northern hardwood forest species.

The summit and west side of Poppy Mountain is located within the town of Hancock and the eastern slopes within Lanesborough.

The Taconic Range ridgeline continues north from Poppy Mountain as Potter Mountain (also known as Jiminy Peak), south as Honwee Mountain, and west across the Wyomanock Creek valley as Rounds Mountain. The west side of the mountain drains into Kinderhook Creek, the Hudson River and Long Island Sound. The east side drains into Daniels Brook and Churchill Brook, thence into Onota Lake, the Housatonic River, and Long Island Sound.

References
 Massachusetts Trail Guide (2004). Boston: Appalachian Mountain Club.
 Commonwealth Connections proposal PDF download. Retrieved March 2, 2008.
 AMC Massachusetts and Rhode Island Trail Guide (1989). Boston: Appalachian Mountain Club.
 "Greenways and Trails" Massachusetts DCR. Retrieved February 22, 2008.

External links
 Pittsfield State Forest map
 Pittsfield State Forest. Massachusetts DCR.

Mountains of Berkshire County, Massachusetts
Taconic Mountains
Lanesborough, Massachusetts